Areni Hamparian (born 4 January 2002) is an Armenian footballer who plays as a midfielder for the Armenia women's national team.

International career
Hamparian capped for Armenia at senior level in two friendlies against Lithuania on 4 and 6 March 2020.

See also
List of Armenia women's international footballers

References

2002 births
Living people
Women's association football midfielders
Armenian women's footballers
Armenia women's international footballers